Fontaine is a French word meaning fountain or natural spring or an area of natural springs.

Places

France
Beaulieu-les-Fontaines, in the Oise département
Bierry-les-Belles-Fontaines, in the Yonne département
Cailloux-sur-Fontaines, in the Rhône département
Druyes-les-Belles-Fontaines, in the Yonne département
Fontaine, Aube, in the Aube département 
Fontaine, Isère, in the Isère département 
Fontaine, Territoire de Belfort, in the Territoire de Belfort département 
Fontaine-au-Bois, in the Nord département
Fontaine-au-Pire, in the Nord département 
Fontaine-Bellenger, in the Eure département 
Fontaine-Bonneleau, in the Oise département 
Fontaine-Chaalis, in the Oise département 
Fontaine-Chalendray, in the Charente-Maritime département 
Fontaine-Couverte, in the Mayenne département 
Fontaine-de-Vaucluse, in the Vaucluse département 
Fontaine de Vaucluse (spring), a spring in the Vaucluse department
Fontaine-Denis-Nuisy, in the Marne département 
Fontaine-en-Bray, in the Seine-Maritime département 
Fontaine-en-Dormois, in the Marne département 
Fontaine-Étoupefour, in the Calvados département 
Fontaine-Fourches, in the Seine-et-Marne département 
Fontaine-Française, in the Côte-d'Or département

Other countries
Fontaine, Arkansas, United States, an unincorporated community

Other
 Fontaine (surname)
 Fontaine (Charleroi Metro), a metro station in Fontaine-l'Évêque, Belgium

See also
 Fontaines (disambiguation)
 Fontane, a surname
 Fountaine, a surname
 Fountain (disambiguation)
 Lafontaine (disambiguation)
 La Fontaine (disambiguation)
 De la fontaine (disambiguation), including a list of people with the surname